Coffee River Cave  is a large river cave in Manchester Parish in west-central Jamaica.

Natural history
The cave is a large bat roost, and some bat guano is harvested from the outer regions of the cave.

See also
 List of caves in Jamaica
Jamaican Caves Organisation
Manchester Parish, Jamaica

References

External links
Aerial view
Photos: 
Video:  
Coffee River Cave - Jamaican Caves Organisation

Bat roosts
Caves of Jamaica
Geography of Manchester Parish
Caves of the Caribbean